The 2018 Hungarian Athletics Championships were the 123rd edition of the Hungarian Athletics Championships, which took place on 22–24 June 2018 at the Bregyó Inter-Regional Athletic Center in Székesfehérvár.

Schedule

Results

Men

Track

* Indicates the athlete only competed in the preliminary heats and received medals.

Field

Women

Track

* Indicates the athlete only competed in the preliminary heats and received medals.

Field

Medal table

See also
Hungarian Athletics Championships
Hungarian Athletics Association

References

External links
Official website of the Hungarian Athletics Association

Hungarian Athletics Championships
Hungarian Athletics Championships
Athletics Championships
Sport in Székesfehérvár